The Sunset Advisory Commission is an agency of the Texas Legislature that evaluates state agencies and makes recommendations to the legislature on the need for, performance of, and improvements to agencies under review. The commission is headquartered in the Robert E. Johnson State Office Building in Austin.

As of the 87th legislative session in 2021, the commission has abolished 92 state agencies, of which 41 agencies were completely abolished and their functions eliminated, while another 51 were abolished but had their functions transferred to existing or newly created agencies.

History
The commission was created in 1977 by enactment of the Texas Sunset Act (now codified as Chapter 325 of the Texas Government Code).

Composition
The commission has 12 members: 10 legislators and two public members. The leader of each chamber (the Speaker of the Texas House of Representatives and the Lieutenant Governor of Texas, who presides over the Texas Senate) each appoint five legislators and one public member. The chair and vice-chair rotate annually between the two chambers. The commission appoints a director who hires staff to carry out the agency's duties.

Duties

Under the Sunset Act, every state agency (excluding universities, courts, agencies mandated under the Texas Constitution, or those specifically exempted by other legislative action) has a specific date on which it will automatically be abolished unless the legislature passes a bill to continue the agency. Agencies typically are reviewed every 12 years. During the 2009 legislative session, the session adjourned without the legislature continuing several agencies (among them the Texas Department of Transportation, the state's largest), thus requiring the governor to call a special session.

Sunset staff conducts an agency's review in the interim before the session when the agency's enabling act comes under legislative scrutiny. The agency prepares a self-evaluation report for the commission. Sunset staff meets with the agency's leadership and staff as well as interest groups, regulated entities, and members of the public who are affected by the agency. Staff also coordinates with other state oversight agencies, such as the State Auditor's Office and the Legislative Budget Board. After the staff publishes its report with recommendations to the commission, the commission holds a public hearing and takes public comments, then holds a second public meeting to make decisions about which recommendations to adopt, including any new proposals from other sources. The commission can recommend any of the following:
Continue the agency as is.
Continue the agency with modifications (including moving functions from the agency to other agencies, moving functions from other agencies into it, and most commonly, making improvements to the effectiveness and efficiency of an agency's functions).
Merge the agency with another agency.
Disband the agency and either transfer its functions to other agencies, or abolish them altogether.

If the commission recommends continuing the agency, it must provide draft legislation to extend the agency's Sunset date and to make any other recommendations the commission adopted. The legislature must pass a bill in order to continue an agency's existence and has complete freedom to amend or reject the commission's recommendations. Generally, the bill will continue the agency for 12 years (six biennial sessions), but this may be shortened to equalize the number and size of agencies under review each biennium or to allow the commission and the legislature to review the status of significant actions taken regarding the agency. If an agency is abolished, the Sunset Act provides a one-year wind-down period for the agency to conclude its operations.

The commission also performs limited reviews on agencies not subject to the commission at the discretion of the legislature and can recommend that the agency be abolished. In those cases the legislature must pass a bill to abolish the agency without the incentive of an expiring Sunset date in the agency's enabling act.

Notes

References
Sunset In Texas

External links

Official website

Texas Legislature
State agencies of Texas
Texas House of Representatives
Texas Senate